Chimarra is a genus of little black caddisflies in the family Philopotamidae. There are more than 630 described species in Chimarra.

See also
 List of Chimarra species

References

Further reading

External links
 

Articles created by Qbugbot
Trichoptera genera